Pierre Prévost may refer to:

 Pierre Prévost (painter) (1764–1823), French panorama painter
 Pierre Prévost (physicist) (1751–1839), Genevan philosopher and physicist